Bardfield End Green is a hamlet in the Uttlesford district of Essex, England approximately one mile east of Thaxted. It is the home of Thaxted cricket club.

Hamlets in Essex
Thaxted